The Connecticut Metropolitan Council of Governments, or MetroCOG, is a planning organization serving six towns and cities in southwest Connecticut, United States.  MetroCOG is one of nine councils of governments in Connecticut. MetroCOG also serves as a "host agency" for the Greater Bridgeport and Valley Metropolitan Planning Organization.

Towns and cities
MetroCOG is a council of governments and a regional planning organization serving  Bridgeport, Fairfield, Easton, Monroe, Stratford, and Trumbull. MetroCOG also describes a planning region as defined by the State of Connecticut. It regulates economic development, transportation, and environmental quality in the region. Mike Tetreau, a Fairfield First Selectman, serves as the chairperson in 2018.

Policies and activities
As of 2018 MetroCOG is looking into initiating a bike-sharing system that would service Bridgeport, Fairfield and Stratford and perhaps Trumbull, Monroe and Easton.

Another priority of the council is to gain a "county government equivalence designation" from the United States Census in order to be able to apply for many federal programs as since 1960, Connecticut has no county governments.

In 2017 the council worked to secure a $2,050,000 state grant to improve the Pequonnock River trail.

References

Councils of governments
Government of Connecticut